FTP Commander is an FTP client for Windows. The program is developed by InternetSoft Corporation. Features include multiple connections, SSH, SSL, scheduler and backup tool, proxy and firewall support, chmod features, and localization for over 20 languages

See also 
Comparison of FTP client software

External links 
 FTP Commander Website

FTP clients